The eleventh cycle of America's Next Top Model  premiered on September 3, 2008, and was the fifth season to be aired on The CW network. The promotional catchphrase of the cycle was "Feel The Love."

The prizes for this cycle were:

 A modeling contract with Elite Model Management.
 A fashion spread and cover in Seventeen.
 A 100,000 contract with CoverGirl cosmetics.

Approximately the first half of the competition took place in Los Angeles, moving the show back from New York City where it was held last season. The international destination for the final episodes of the cycle was Amsterdam, the Netherlands. The promotional song was "When I Grow Up" by the Pussycat Dolls.

The winner was 19-year-old McKey Sullivan from Lake Forest, Illinois with Samantha Potter placing as the runner up.

Season summary
Starting from this cycle, the contestant called first in judging every week would have her picture (or commercial) displayed as digital art in the models' house for the rest of the week. The CoverGirl of the Week contest was replaced by a new segment called Top Models in Action, focusing on former alums post-show careers.

The show featured fourteen contestants, similar to cycles 3, 4 and 10. The winner of this cycle, similar to the past four cycles, won management and representation by Elite Model Management, a $100,000 contract with CoverGirl cosmetics (including a billboard in Times Square and ads in Walmart), and the cover and six-page fashion spread in Seventeen. This season averaged 4.43 million viewers.

This cycle included a first for the series – having a transgender contestant named Isis King participate and qualify for the final fourteen. The inclusion has been noted as an "unprecedented opportunity" by Neil Giuliano, president of GLAAD, a national LGBT media advocacy group.

Contestants 
(Ages stated are at time of contest)

Episodes

Summaries

Call-out order

 The contestant was eliminated
 The contestant was eliminated outside of judging panel
 The contestant won the competition

Bottom two

 The contestant was eliminated after their first time in the bottom two
 The contestant was eliminated after their second time in the bottom two
 The contestant was eliminated after their third time in the bottom two
 The contestant was eliminated outside of the judging panel
 The contestant was eliminated in the final judging and placed as the runner-up

Average  call-out order
Casting call-out order and final two are not included.

Photo shoot guide
Episode 2 photo shoot: Group photo of mini girl in the middle of the giant city
Episode 3 photo shoot: Hanging on a rope ladder from a hot air balloon
Episode 4 Commercial: Dramatize Motion Video At the beach 
Episode 5 photoshoot: Challenging Beauty with the feel of an eel pond
Episode 6 photoshoot: Fierces eyes above water
Episode 7 photo shoot: Extreme Upscale Fashion Hanger With Body Movement
Episode 9 photo shoot: Natural Disasters Editorial
Episode 10 photo shoot: 17th Century pirates on a Dutch clipper ship
Episode 11 photo shoots: Minnerworker girl In 1800's
Episode 12 photo shoot: Windmill couture
Episose 13 photo shoot: Classic Holland Gowns At Vintage City
Episode 14 photo shoot and commercial: Cinderella Castle Photoshoot And Commercial "The Top Model Aura In Life"

Judges

 Tyra Banks
 Nigel Barker
 J. Alexander
 Paulina Porizkova

Makeovers
 Brittany - Long straight black weave
 Hannah - Bob cut with bangs and dyed dark brown
 Isis - Long wavy dark brown weave
 Clark - Dyed chocolate brown
 Lauren Brie - Dyed platinum blonde
 Joslyn - Long curly black weave
 Sheena - Trimmed and dyed brown with blonde highlights
 Elina - Curly red weave
 Marjorie - Dyed light brown
 Analeigh - Layered and dyed blonde
 Samantha - Cut short and dyed platinum blonde
 McKey - Pixie cut and dyed black

Post-Top Model careers

Sharaun Brown signed with Elite Model Management in Chicago and LA.
Nikeysha Clarke is still searching for an agency.
Marjorie Conrad signed with Look Model Agency in San Francisco and was featured in the American Apparel Daily Update and opened a Marciano Fashion Show. In April 2014, she was working on her directorial debut "Chemical Cut" and launched a funding campaign on the website Kickstarter.
Clark Gilmer competed for Miss South Carolina USA earning her a spot in the top 10. She is a full-time professional model living in Los Angeles with boyfriend Kenny Florian. She appears on Enrique Iglesias music video "Tonight (I'm lovein' You)" and Taylor Swift music video "Mean". She has appeared in Bravo's The Millionaire Matchmaker as a date for one of the millionaire bachelors." She also made two appearances on the hit TV show How I Met Your Mother, one in 2010 and the other one in 2011 as Barney Stinson's date. 
Lauren Brie signed with Major Model in New York, MGMT First in New York, Muse Management in New York, L.A. Models, Nova Models in New Zealand and signed with Priscilla's Model Management in Sydney, Australia under the name "Brie."
Elina Ivanova has signed with TCM Models & Talent in Seattle and Vision Models in Los Angeles since 2013 and then signed with Elite Model Management in LA .
Isis King successfully underwent gender reassignment surgery; she had done test shots which were featured in The Tyra Banks Show together with her surgery. She also appeared on America's Next Top Model, Cycle 17, the first all-star edition of the show. In 2012, she became American Apparel's first openly transgender model. 
Joslyn Pennywell has done some test shoots and now lives in Los Angeles. She has modeled for Reset Couture and appeared in a commercial. She walked at the Runway On Fire Fashion Show and Trendsetters fashion show. She also appeared in BET's The Family Crews and Bravo's The Millionaire Matchmaker as a date for one of the millionaire bachelors.
Samantha Potter signed with L.A. Models and has walked for designers Individuals by AMFI, EиD by Eva and Delia, Ready to Fish by Ilja Visser and Addy van de Krommenacker at Amsterdam International Fashion Week 2009 as part her prize in episode 10. She also appeared as one of the "Top Models in Action" in Cycle 12. In 2008, she appeared in  The Big Bang Theory in the episode "The Panty Piñata Polarization", along with contestant Lio Tipton (credited as Analeigh Tipton), but her role was a non-speaking one. Potter also appeared in gospel artists Mary Mary's music video for God In Me.
Sheena Sakai signed with Model Management Group and Roman Personal Management. She has also modeled for 1800whoopass, appeared in a Trojan condoms commercial and walked in BET's Rip the Runway 2009. as well as She by Sheree SS 2010. Sakai also appeared on America's Next Top Model, Cycle 17, the first all-star edition of the show.
Brittany Rubalcaba left the modelling industry to further her education.
McKey Sullivan collected all of her prizes and signed with Elite Model Management in Chicago. She was featured in the December 2008 issue of In Touch Weekly. She appeared on the cover and had a spread in the February 2009 issue of Seventeen magazine as part of her ANTM prize package. She also has been on the cover of Forest & Bluff Magazine, January 2009 issue and Nylon Magazine, March 2009. She has recently been featured on Yahoo Style with Whitney Thompson. She had the cover and a spread in Chicago Scene, June 2009, as well as various advertisements for Forever 21, Rendezvous, Myer, Crabtree and Evelyn and Sass and Bide. She also appeared on the September 2009 issue of Marie Claire modelling Oroton, Fendi and Miu Miu handbags and purses. Sullivan was featured on the Cover Fall 2009 cover and interior fashion spread of Vogue knitting magazine. She walked for EиD by Eva and Delia, Mada van Gaans, Ready to Fish by Ilja Visser and Addy van den Krommenacker at Amsterdam International Fashion Week 2009 as part her prize in episode 10. McKey also walked for G-Star at Mercedes-Benz Fashion Week Fall 2009. She walked in Trinidad and Tobago Fashion Week 2009 for Heather Jones Designs Limited. She appeared in Dutch Avantgarde with Samantha Potter. She also appeared on the runway for Mr. Jay's clothing line called "attitude" along with cycle 12 contestant with Aminat Ayinde. During her My Life as a CoverGirl commercials, it was revealed that she had been working with the Make-A-Wish Foundation. She was named one of People magazine's Most Beautiful People of 2009. She was also named the 44th sexiest woman of 2008 by BuddyTv.
Lio Tipton (credited as Analeigh Tipton through to 2021) signed with Abrams Artists Agency, in both the commercial and theatrical divisions and Ford Models in Los Angeles. They have appeared in campaigns for Forever 21, and Guess. They made their acting breakout starring as Jessica in the movie Crazy, Stupid, Love. Their acting has also booked them modeling campaigns for Teen Vogue, Maxim, Details, and Nylon. They starred in an American zombie romantic film Warm Bodies based on Isaac Marion's popular novel of the same name, which was released on February 1, 2013. In 2014, they were one of the leads in the ABC television series Manhattan Love Story before it was canceled due to low ratings. In 2021, Tipton came out as non-binary, changing their pronouns to they/them and their name to Lio.
Hannah White has taken test shots and is now signed with Nous Model Management.

Notes

References

External links
 

A11
2008 American television seasons
ETC (Philippine TV network) original programming
Transgender-related television shows
Television shows filmed in California
Television shows filmed in the Netherlands